Alizé Cornet and Virginie Razzano were the defending champions, but Cornet chose not to participate. Razzano partnered up with Alexandra Cadanțu, but they lost to Maria Kondratieva and Olga Savchuk in the first round.

Catalina Castaño and Mervana Jugić-Salkić won the title defeating Stéphanie Foretz Gacon and Tatjana Malek in the final 6–4, 5–7, [10–4].

Seeds

Draw

Draw

References
 Main Draw

Internationaux Feminins de la Vienne - Doubles